Diallo Fadima Touré is a French-Canadian returnee to Mali, and the Minister of Culture and Tourism of Mali.

References

External links 

 

Living people
Culture ministers
Tourism ministers of Mali
Government ministers of Mali
Canadian emigrants to Mali
Year of birth missing (living people)
21st-century Malian people